Numerous video games were released in 2013. Many awards went to games such as BioShock Infinite, Grand Theft Auto V, The Last of Us and The Legend of Zelda: A Link Between Worlds. New video game consoles released in 2013 include the PlayStation 4 from Sony Computer Entertainment and the Xbox One from Microsoft.

Top-rated games

Major awards

Critically acclaimed titles
Metacritic (MC) and GameRankings (GR) are aggregators of video game journalism reviews.

Highest-grossing games
The following were 2013's top ten highest-grossing video games in terms of worldwide revenue (including physical sales, digital purchases, subscriptions, microtransactions, free-to-play and pay-to-play) across all platforms (including mobile, PC and console platforms).

Events

Console releases
The list of game consoles released in 2013 in North America.

Series with new entries
Series with new installments in 2013 include Ace Attorney, ARMA, Army of Two, Assassin's Creed, Batman: Arkham, Battlefield, BioShock, Call of Duty, Crysis, Dead Rising, Dead Space, Devil May Cry, Final Fantasy, Fire Emblem, Forza Motorsport, God of War, Gears of War, Gran Turismo, Grand Theft Auto, Killer Instinct, Killzone, The Legend of Zelda, Lost Planet, Luigi's Mansion, Mario Party, Metal Gear, Metro, Need for Speed, Pokémon, Rayman, Pikmin, Saints Row, SimCity, Sly Cooper, Sonic The Hedgehog, StarCraft, Super Mario, Tom Clancy's Splinter Cell, Tomb Raider, Total War, and Zoo Tycoon.

In addition, 2013 saw the introduction of several new properties, including Beyond: Two Souls, The Last of Us, Papers, Please, Tearaway, and The Wonderful 101.

Game releases
The list of games released in 2013 in North America.

January–March

April–June

July–September

October–December

Video game-based film and television releases

See also
2013 in games

References

External links
 Most popular 2013 video game articles viewed on Wikipedia, with user comments on traffic jumps - The latest statistics can be found on Wikitop

 
Video games by year